Pronycticebus was a genus of adapiformes primates that lived during the middle to middle late Eocene. It is represented by two species, Pronycticebus gaudryi and Pronycticebus neglectus, of which an almost complete specimen was found in Germany, and the Quercy Phosphorites Formation of France.

Morphology
Pronycticebus neglectus possessed what appears to be a grooming claw on the second digit of each foot like modern strepsirhines (Fleagle, 1999) and had a dental formula of 2:1:4:3. Pronycticebus neglectus has a petrosal bulla and a postorbital bar. Pronycticebus neglectus may have been a nocturnal or a crepuscular species, which is suggested by a relatively large orbital size. Pronycticebus neglectus has a relatively large baculum for a species of its size, which had an average body mass of 825 grams.

Range
Pronycticebus neglectus lived in Europe.

Locomotion
Based upon limb morphology, Pronycticebus neglectus moved by quadrupedalism, leaping, and climbing. This species is less of a leaper than the notharctines and used slow quadrupedalism less than the adapines.

References

Conroy, G.C. 1990. Primate Evolution. W.W. Norton and Co.: New York.
Martin, R.D. 1990. Primate Origins and Evolution: A Phylogenetic Reconstruction. Princeton University Press: Princeton, New Jersey.

http://www.aim.unizh.ch/StaffofInstitute/AffResearchers/uthal/Publications.html
Mikko's Phylogeny Archive

Literature cited

 
 

Prehistoric strepsirrhines
Eocene primates
Prehistoric primate genera
Paleogene France
Fossils of France
Quercy Phosphorites Formation
Paleogene Germany
Fossils of Germany
Fossil taxa described in 1904